Hopewell is an unincorporated community in Mecklenburg County, North Carolina, United States. It lies at an elevation of 758 feet (231 m).

References

Unincorporated communities in Mecklenburg County, North Carolina
Unincorporated communities in North Carolina